I Killed Einstein, Gentlemen is a 1970 Czechoslovak science fiction comedy film directed by Oldřich Lipský. The film starred Jiří Sovák, Jana Brejchová, Lubomír Lipský, Iva Janžurová, Petr Čepek, and other actors. The major plot revolves around timetraveling to the past to change the future.

The film was shot in late summer 1968 and premiered in Czechoslovakia on 27 February 1970.

In the film, a character uses a device which has been likened to a selfie stick, several decades before its modern design was developed.

Cast 
Jiří Sovák - Professor David Moore
Jana Brejchová - Gwen Williamsová
Lubomír Lipský - Professor Frank Pech
Iva Janžurová - Betsy
Petr Čepek - Albert Einstein
Radoslav Brzobohatý - Robert
Svatopluk Beneš - Giacometti
Jan Libícek - Smith
Viktor Maurer - Snyder
Miloš Kopecký - Wertheim
Stella Zázvorková - Wertheimová
Oldrich Musil - Rektor Rath
Josef Hlinomaz - Velitel policie
Karel Effa - Zástupce velitele policie
Josef Bláha - reditel Fizikálního ustávu

References

External links
 

1970 films
1970s science fiction comedy films
1970s Czech-language films
Czechoslovak science fiction comedy films
Films directed by Oldřich Lipský
Czech science fiction comedy films
Cultural depictions of Albert Einstein
1970 comedy films
Czech post-apocalyptic films
1970s Czech films